Jahor Aljaksandravič Marcinovič (born 3 September 1988) is a Belarusian journalist who is currently serving as chief editor of Nasha Niva since 2017. In July 2021 he was arrested for alleged debts of the newspaper to the electric company, estimated damage amounted to 10,000 Belarusian rubles ($3000). On March 15, 2022, he was sentenced to 2.5 years in prison. Human rights activists in Belarus have recognized him as a political prisoner.

Biography

Family and Career 

Jahor is a son of Belarusian writer  and poet . His brother  is a historian and journalist.

Jahor graduated from the BSU Journalism faculty in 2011. He started working at Nasha Niva in 2009 and became an author of many important interviews, reports and investigations. In 2017 he replaced Andrej Skurko on the post of chief editor.

In 2015, 2016 and 2017 he was awarded with BAJ prize 'Volnaye Slova'.

Marcinovič has experienced pressure from the authorities for his journalistic activity many times. On September 23, 2020, he was detained for three days for alleged defamation of the MVD vice minister , his apartment was searched. Marcinovič as the NN chief editor was taken responsible for alleged defamation in the published interview, where a former prisoner of a detention centre claimed to be beaten by Barsukou.

In March 2021 he was arrested while covering the meeting in Minsk square and sentenced to a fine for participation in an unauthorized demonstration, even though he denied participating in the meeting. After the president election of 2020 he was arrested on August 11, 2020, and released with a travel ban.

2021 Arrests 

Together with the head of marketing Andrej Skurko and journalist, head of NN publications ‘Nasha Historyja’ and ‘Arche’ Andrej Dyńko, Jahor was arrested on July 8, 2021. He was beaten by the police and received head injury. For 24 hours was kept at the Okrestina detention center without food, mattress or bedding. Later Marcinovič was charged under part 2 of Art.216 of the Belarusian Criminal Code for alleged NN debts to the "Minenergo" company. According to the police, the NN failed to pay utility bills for 4 years and damaged the company by 3500 thousand Belarusian roubles.

Marcinovič should have been released on July 16, 2021, but he was charged under another article of Criminal Code for alleged causing of mass disorders. His message from November 2021 was that he was kept with 19 persons in a basement cell and that he was suffocating. On March 15, 2022, Marcinovič and Skurko were sentenced to 2.5 years in prison for estimated material damage of 10,000 Belarusian rubles (US$3,000) to Minenergo. According to the investigators, in May 2017 they opened offices in Skurko's apartment but kept paying for electricity as individuals, while Belarusian law obliges legal persons to pay increased rates. The damages were paid.

The Viasna Human Rights Centre, the Belarusian Helsinki Committee, and other human rights organisations recognized him as a political prisoner.

References

Living people
1988 births
Writers from Brest, Belarus
Belarusian journalists
Belarusian media executives
Political prisoners according to Viasna Human Rights Centre